Dhaka-20 is a constituency represented in the Jatiya Sangsad (National Parliament) of Bangladesh since 2019 by Benzir Ahmed of the Awami League.

Boundaries 
The constituency encompasses Dhamrai Upazila.

History 
The constituency was created when, ahead of the 2008 general election, the Election Commission redrew constituency boundaries to reflect population changes revealed by the 2001 Bangladesh census. At the previous general election, in 2001, Dhamrai Upazila corresponded to constituency Dhaka-13. The 2008 redistricting added 7 new seats to Dhaka District, increasing the number of constituencies in the district from 13 to 20. One of the new seats usurped the name Dhaka-13, and the former constituency of that name became Dhaka-20.

Members of Parliament

Elections

Elections in the 2010s 
M. A. Maleque was elected unopposed in the 2014 General Election after opposition parties withdrew their candidacies in a boycott of the election.

Elections in the 2000s

References

External links
 

Parliamentary constituencies in Bangladesh
Dhaka District